Fenerbahçe Boxing is the men's and women's boxing department of Fenerbahçe S.K., a major sports club in Istanbul, Turkey. The boxers of Fenerbahçe use the Dereağzı Facilities, belonging to the club.

Founded in 1914, they are the most successful boxing department in Turkey, having won a record number of titles in all competitions in the men's department. The women's section became runners-up in the European Champions Cup in 1999, which is the best result so far for any Turkish team.

Overall, Fenerbahçe Boxing has nurtured some of the greatest boxers in Turkish boxing history, with numerous Mediterranean, European, Olympic, and Worldwide honours won for Turkish sports and the club itself.

Honours (Men)

National competitions
 Turkish Clubs' Boxing Championship
 Winners (16) (record): 1987-88, 1989–90, 1994–95, 1996-1997, 1997–98, 1998–99, 2004–05, 2005–06, 2007–08, 2008–09, 2009–10, 2010–11, 2011–12, 2012–13, 2014–15, 2015–16
 Runners-up (6): 1965-66, 1966–67, 1990–91, 1995–96, 2000–01, 2006–07
 Turkish Championship
 Winners (21) (record): 1985-86, 1986–87, 1987–88, 1988–89, 1989–90, 1990–91, 1992–93, 1994–95, 1995–96, 1998–99, 2000–01, 2004–05, 2005–06, 2007–08, 2008–09, 2009–10, 2010–11, 2011–12, 2012–13, 2013–14, 2014–15
 Runners-up (5): 1984-85, 1996–97, 1999-2000, 2001–02, 2006–07
 Istanbul Clubs' Boxing Championship
 Winners (12) (shared-record): 1957-58, 1962–63, 1965–66, 1966–67, 1968–69, 1970–71, 1985–86, 1986–87, 1987–88, 1988–89, 2011–12, 2012-13
 Runners-up (11): 1955-56, 1956–57, 1958–59, 1959–60, 1961–62, 1964–65, 1967–68, 1969–70, 1971–72, 1972–73, 1974–75
 Istanbul Individual Boxing Championship
 Winners (26) (record): 1927-28, 1964–65, 1965–66, 1966–67, 1967–68, 1968–69, 1982–83, 1984–85, 1987–88, 1989–90, 1990–91, 1991–92, 1992–93, 1993–94, 1994–95, 1995–96, 1997–98, 1998–99, 2007–08, 2009–10, 2010–11, 2011–12, 2012–13, 2013-2014, 2014–15, 2015–16
 Runners-up (8): 1971-72, 1972–73, 1981–82, 1983–84, 2002–03, 2005–06, 2006–07, 2008-09

Honours (Women)

International competitions
 European Champions Cup
 Runners-up (1): 1999 (Lviv, Ukraine)

National competitions
Turkish Clubs' Boxing Championship
 Winners (3): 2006–07, 2007–08, 2008–09

Individual Titles of Fenerbahçe Boxers
 World Championships
 Gold Medal: Mustafa Genç (1994, Juniors), Kıymet Karpuzoğlu (2001, Kickbox), Kıymet Karpuzoğlu (2005, Kickbox), Hüseyin Dündar (2008, Wushu), Gülsüm Tatar (2008), Ayşe Çağırır (2022), Buse Naz Çakıroğlu (2022), Hatice Akbaş (2022), Şennur Demir (2022)
 Silver Medal: Fikret Güneş (1991), Enver Yılmaz (1992, Juniors), Nurhan Süleymanoğlu (1995), Agasi Ağagüloğlu (2001) 
 Bronze Medal: Fikret Güneş (1990), Akın Kuloğlu (1993), Ramaz Paliani (1999), Akın Kuloğlu (1999), Mehmet Handem (1999), Kadri Kordel (2008), Adem Kılıççı (2008), Yakup Kılınç (2008), Sema Çalışkan (2022)
 Olympics
 Silver Medal: Malik Beyleroğlu (1996), Atagün Yalçınkaya (2004), Buse Naz Çakıroğlu (2020)
 Bronze Medal: Yakup Kılınç (2008)
 European Championships
 Gold Medal: Nurhan Süleymanoğlu (1993), Nurhan Süleymanoğlu (1995), Ramaz Paliani (1999), Agasi Ağagüloğlu (1999), Ramaz Paliani (2000), Agasi Ağagüloğlu (2000), Ramaz Paliani (2001), Sümeyra Kaya (2006), Sümeyra Kaya (2007) 
 Silver Medal: Agasi Ağagüloğlu (2001) 
 Bronze Medal: Akın Kuloğlu (1993), Ahmet Canbakış (1993), Vahdettin İşsever (1995), Nurhan Süleymanoğlu (1999), Selim Phaliani (1999), Nurhan Süleymanoğlu (2000), Selim Phaliani (2000), Kıymet Karpuzoğlu (2000), Gülsüm Tatar (2006)
Mediterranean Games
 Gold Medal: Nurhan Süleymanoğlu (1993), Akın Kuloğlu (1993), Vahdettin İşsever (1995), Nurhan Süleymanoğlu (1995), Agasi Ağagüloğlu (2001), Ramaz Paliani (2001), Atagün Yalçınkaya (2005)
Balkan Games
 Gold Medal: Eraslan Doruk (1972), Yener Durmuş (1975), Abdülkadir Güler (1975), Yener Durmuş (1981), Bülent Angın (1982), Ali Çıtak (1985), Vahdettin İşsever (1986), Ali Çıtak (1987)

Current squad

Technical staff
Boxing team officials according to the official website:

Current squads

Men's squad
Oğuzhan Sağlam
Hüseyin Dündar
Yakup Kılıç
Adem Kılıççı
Kadri Kordel
Yakup Şener
Onur Şipal
Önder Şipal
Atagün Yalçınkaya

Women's squad
Ayşe Çağırır
Beyza Saraçoğlu
Buse Naz Çakıroğlu
Büşra Işıldar
Esra Yıldız
Hatice Akbaş
Sema Çalışkan
Şennur Demir

References

External links
Official Fenerbahçe website 

Boxing
Sport in Kadıköy
Fenerbahçe boxers
Boxing clubs in Turkey
1914 establishments in the Ottoman Empire
Turkish male boxers
Sports clubs established in 1914